John Porter M.R.C.S., L.S.A. was an English surgeon, author and historian. He published several histories of Lancashire, notably History of the Fylde of Lancashire.

Life and career 
In 1869, Porter passed the examination in the Science and Practice of Medicine and received a certificate to practice.

His 1876 publication, History of the Fylde of Lancashire, was dedicated to Benjamin Whitworth, Esquire, M.P., "in admiration of his enterprise, generosity, and philanthropy". Porter wrote the book while living in Fleetwood. It received a less-than-favourable review in The Academy: "We were happy in the delusion that local histories of this type had become a thing of the past. The volume is too big for the subject, and the subject is too much for the author."

Towards the end of his life, Porter was listed as being a physicians' visiting assistant at Manchester Royal Infirmary and house surgeon to the Chorlton Dispensary in Manchester.

Selected bibliography 

 History of the Fylde of Lancashire (W. Porter and Sons, 1876)

References 

Date of birth missing
Date of death missing
19th-century English historians
People from Fleetwood
Writers from Lancashire
Fellows of the Royal College of Surgeons